Carrier or Déné syllabics (Dʌlk'ʷahke, (Dulkw'ahke) meaning toad feet) is a script created by Adrien-Gabriel Morice for the Carrier language. It was inspired by Cree syllabics and is one of the writing systems in the Canadian Aboriginal syllabics Unicode range.

History
The Dakelh people once enjoyed extensive literacy with the script. It is recorded that it was often used to write messages on trees, and Morice published a newspaper in syllabics which was in print from 1891 to 1894. Some transcriptions of Latin and English have been recorded as well. Its usage began to decline around 1920, when the Carrier language was banned from the local schools. The switch was rather abrupt, to the point that parents would write in syllabics and their children would write in the alphabet, and neither could understand the other's writing.

In the 1960s, the Carrier Linguistic Committee (CLC) in Fort St. James created a standardized form of the Latin alphabet for usage in the Carrier language. This is now the preferred form of writing the language, although Carrier syllabics is still often seen as  more authentic to the culture.

Description
Carrier syllabics is designed so that syllables which begin with the same consonant have the same basic form. Depending on the following vowel, this form may be rotated, flipped, or a diacritic may be added in the centre which is a short stroke for ⟨e⟩ and a centre dot for ⟨i⟩. There are special characters for consonants that do not immediately precede a tautosyllabic vowel, which is to say coda consonants, the first of a sequence of two onset consonants, and the nasals when syllabic preceding another consonant. The glottal stop is also written using a separate character, even when it immediately precedes a tautosyllabic vowel.

Carrier syllabics is written from left to right. Morice originally intended to have regular spacing between words; however, in practice, the letters were sporadically spaced, and the gaps between them did not often correlate to separate words. There was no formally defined punctuation; Morice used the modern punctuation of the Latin alphabet.

Suffix  or  indicates long vowels. A variant of ᔆ is used for the laminal/apical distinction, but it is not supported by Unicode and in any case the rest of the series is missing.

Prefix  marks proper names. 

Some fonts have ᘨ  dlu reversed: the serif should be on the left, as in lu, not the right as in tlu.

Unicode

Carrier syllabics have been included in Unicode, along with related Canadian Aboriginal scripts, which use the same codes where they share glyphs.

External links
Yinka Déné Language Institute: Déné syllabics – history and description of Déné (Carrier) syllabics
Yinka Déné Language Institute:  - Web page that transliterates between the syllabics and the Carrier Linguistic Committee Roman writing systems
Omniglot.com: Carrier syllabary (Déné syllabics) ᑐᑊᘁᗕᑋᗸ – description of the Carrier syllabary, including charts and images
William J. Poser: Dʌlk'ʷahke: the first Carrier writing system. 25 February 2003 – detailed history of the syllabary, with photographs of inscriptions
William J. Poser:  Introduction to the Carrier Syllabics.  A textbook with sample readings from real texts. Available from Lulu.
Languagegeek.com: Athabaskan syllabics keyboard layouts and fonts
Carrier reading-book by Rev. A.G. Morice, O.M.I. = ᗫᐧ ᑐᔆᘼᔆ ᐅᙨᑐᑊᐧᐈᑋ *ᘇᘀᙆᘬ ᐈᐪ ᗫᑊ-ᘉᘦᔆ ᗗᒡ ᘇᐪ ᐅᘐᐣᘧ. 2nd edition, 1894

Carrier prayer-book = ᑐᔆᘼᔆ ᐁᘁᗒᐪ ᗟᘇᙆᑐᘬ (IPA: dʌstlʼʌs ukʷʼʌt tenazdʌdli). 1st edition, 1901
S̲aik'uz̲ Carrier dictionary

Dakelh
Canadian Aboriginal syllabics